Herbie Smith (27 August 1895 – 15 March 1959) was an Australian rules footballer who played with Geelong in the Victorian Football League (VFL).

Notes

External links 

1895 births
1959 deaths
Australian rules footballers from Victoria (Australia)
Geelong Football Club players
Prahran Football Club players